Attack Decay Sustain Release is the debut album from Simian Mobile Disco. It was released on June 18, 2007 on Wichita Recordings and reached #59 in the UK album charts.

History
The title of the album is a reference to the ADSR envelope, a component of many synthesizers, samplers, and other electronic musical instruments the function of which is to modulate some aspect of the instrument's sound—often its volume—over time.

Five of the album's ten tracks ("Hustler", "Tits & Acid", "I Believe", "Hotdog" and lead single "It's The Beat") were available prior to the album's release.

A double-disc version of the album contains six alternate versions on a separate CD.

Initial copies bought from Rough Trade Shops came with a bonus 4-track rarities CD.

Legacy
The Swedish heavy metal band Ghost covered "I Believe" for their Popestar EP, which consisted mainly of covers.

Track listing

References 

2007 debut albums
Simian Mobile Disco albums
Albums produced by James Ford (musician)
Wichita Recordings albums